Ucrainca is a commune in Căușeni District, Moldova. It is composed of two villages, Ucrainca and Zviozdocica.

References

Communes of Căușeni District